Quants Reserve is a nature reserve north west of Burnworthy in Somerset, England.

It consists of a grassland clearing in a forestry plantation. It is well known for its butterflies — among the species which occur are Duke of Burgundy, marsh fritillary and wood white.

In 1988 an area of 50.6 hectares (126.0 acres) was designated as a Biological Site of Special Scientific Interest.

References

Sites of Special Scientific Interest in Somerset
Special Areas of Conservation in England
Nature reserves in Somerset